Levi Simeon Davis (born 12 March 1998) is an English rugby union player who plays as a winger. He is currently missing; at the time of his disappearance, he was a player with Worthing Raiders in the National League 2 South.

Professional career
In January 2020, Davis joined  on loan for the remainder of the 2019–20 RFU Championship, making three appearances before the season was curtailed by the COVID-19 pandemic. In August 2020, having departed Bath, he joined Ealing on a permanent transfer signing a two-year deal.

Levi joined Worthing Raiders in the autumn of 2021 making his debut in the away fixture at Henley Hawks. He scored his first try in a 28–26 defeat at home to Hinckley a week later.

Personal life
Davis took part in The X Factor: Celebrity in late 2019, as part of the group Try Star, along with fellow rugby union players, Thom Evans and Ben Foden. They placed fifth in the competition.

In September 2020, Davis came out as bisexual. This made him the first professional rugby union player to come out as bisexual while still playing.

He released his debut single, "With Me", under the name LEDA on 14 September 2022.

In November 2022, Davis was reported missing after his former rugby club issued an appeal for information on his whereabouts, with him last being seen at a pub in Barcelona, Spain on 29 October. His passport was located at a Barcelona port in November 2022.

See also
List of people who disappeared

References

External links
itsrugby.co.uk Profile

1998 births
Living people
Missing people
2020s missing person cases
Ealing Trailfinders Rugby Club players
English rugby union players
Bath Rugby players
Bisexual men
Bisexual sportspeople
English LGBT sportspeople
Missing person cases in Spain
Rugby union wings